The ICO file format is an image file format for computer icons in Microsoft Windows. ICO files contain one or more small images at multiple sizes and color depths, such that they may be scaled appropriately. In Windows, all executables that display an icon to the user, on the desktop, in the Start Menu, or in Windows Explorer, must carry the icon in ICO format.

The CUR file format is an almost identical image file format for non-animated cursors in Microsoft Windows. The only differences between these two file formats are the bytes used to identify them and the addition of a hotspot in the CUR format header; the hotspot is defined as the pixel offset (in x,y coordinates) from the top-left corner of the cursor image where the user is actually pointing the mouse.

The ANI file format is used for animated Windows cursors.

History 
Icons introduced in Windows 1.0 were 32×32 pixels in size and were monochrome. Support for 16 colors was introduced in Windows 3.0.

Win32 introduced support for storing icon images of up to 16.7 million colors (TrueColor) and up to 256x256 pixels in dimensions. Windows 95 also introduced a new Device Independent Bitmap (DIB) engine. However, 256 color was the default icon color depth in Windows 95. It was possible to enable 65535 color (Highcolor) icons by either modifying the Shell Icon BPP value in the registry or by purchasing Microsoft Plus! for Windows 95. The Shell Icon Size value allows using larger icons in place of 32×32 icons and the Shell Small Icon Size value allows using custom sizes in place of 16×16 icons. Thus, a single icon file could store images of any size from 1×1 pixel up to 256×256 pixels (including non-square sizes) with 2 (rarely used),16, 256, 65535, or 16.7 million colors; but the shell could not display very large sized icons. The notification area of the Windows taskbar was limited to 16 color icons by default until Windows Me when it was updated to support high color icons.

Windows XP added support for 32-bit color (16.7 million colors plus 8-bit alpha channel transparency) icon images, thus allowing semitransparent areas like shadows, anti-aliasing, and glass-like effects to be drawn in an icon. Windows XP, by default, employs 48×48 pixel icons in Windows Explorer. Windows XP can be forced to use icons as large as 256×256 by modifying the Shell icon size value but this would cause all 32×32 icons throughout the shell to be upscaled. Microsoft only recommended icon sizes up to 48×48 pixels for Windows XP. Windows XP can downscale larger icons if no closer image size is available.

Windows Vista added full support for 256×256-pixel icons, as well as support for the compressed PNG format. Although compression is not required, Microsoft recommends that all 256×256 icons in ICO files should be stored in PNG format to reduce the overall size of the file. The Windows Vista Explorer supports smoothly scaling icons to non-standard sizes which are rendered on the fly even if an image is not present for that size in the icon file. The Windows Vista shell adds a slider for "zooming" the icon sizes in and out. With users using higher resolutions and high DPI modes, larger icon formats (such as 256×256) are recommended.

MIME type 
While the IANA-registered MIME type for ICO files is image/vnd.microsoft.icon, it was submitted to IANA in 2003 by a third party and is not recognised by Microsoft software, which uses image/x-icon or image/ico instead. Erroneous types image/ico, image/icon, text/ico and application/ico have also been seen in use.

Icon resource structure 
An ICO or CUR file is made up of an ICONDIR ("Icon directory") structure, containing an ICONDIRENTRY structure for each image in the file, followed by a contiguous block of all image bitmap data (which may be in either Windows BMP format, excluding the BITMAPFILEHEADER structure, or in PNG format, stored in its entirety).

Images with less than 32 bits of color depth follow a particular format: the image is encoded as a single image consisting of a color mask (the "XOR mask") together with an opacity mask (the "AND mask"). The XOR mask must precede the AND mask inside the bitmap data; if the image is stored in bottom-up order (which it most likely is), the XOR mask would be drawn below the AND mask. The AND mask is 1 bit per pixel, regardless of the color depth specified by the BMP header, and specifies which pixels are fully transparent(1) and which are fully opaque(0). The XOR mask conforms to the bit depth specified in the BMP header and specifies the numerical color or palette value for each pixel. Together, the AND mask and XOR mask make for a non-transparent image representing an image with 1-bit transparency; they also allow for inversion of the background. The height for the image in the ICONDIRENTRY structure of the ICO/CUR file takes on that of the intended image dimensions (after the masks are composited), whereas the height in the BMP header takes on that of the two mask images combined (before they are composited). Therefore, the masks must each be of the same dimensions, and the height specified in the BMP header must be exactly twice the height specified in the ICONDIRENTRY structure.

32-bit images (including 32-bit BITMAPINFOHEADER-format BMP images) are specifically a 24-bit image with the addition of an 8-bit channel for alpha compositing. Thus, in 32-bit images, the AND mask is not required, but recommended for consideration. Windows XP and higher will use a 32-bit image in less than True color mode by constructing an AND mask based on the alpha channel (if one does not reside with the image already) if no 24-bit version of the image is supplied in the ICO/CUR file. However, earlier versions of Windows interpret all pixels with 100% opacity unless an AND mask is supplied with the image. Supplying a custom AND mask will also allow for tweaking and hinting by the icon author. Even if the AND mask is not supplied, if the image is in Windows BMP format, the BMP header must still specify a doubled height.

It's important to note that in the AND mask, as for the pixel array of the bitmap, padding bytes must be appended to the end of each row in order to bring up its length to a multiple of four bytes since it's basically a (monochrome) bitmap. The AND mask of an 8x8 pixels bitmap would have 1 byte of data and 3 bytes of padding(8*8*1bpp = 64 bits/8 = 8 bytes of total rows, so each row is 1 byte and 3 bytes of padding are needed), a 16x16 bitmap's AND mask would have 2 bytes of data and 2 bytes of padding, a 32x32 bitmap's AND mask would have 4 bytes of data and no padding. Note that the quantity of padding bytes needed depend on the dimensions of the bitmap and not its color depth since the AND mask is 1 bit per pixel regardless.

Outline 
All values in ICO/CUR files are represented in little-endian byte order.

Header

Structure of image directory

Referenced image data 

All image data referenced by entries in the image directory proceed directly after the image directory. It is customary practice to store them in the same order as defined in the image directory.

Recall that if an image is stored in BMP format, it must exclude the opening , whereas if it is stored in PNG format, it must be stored in its entirety.

Note that the height of the BMP image must be twice the height declared in the image directory. The second half of the bitmap should
be an AND mask for the existing screen pixels, with the output pixels given by the formula . Set the mask to be zero everywhere for a clean overwrite.

PNG format 
The ability to read PNG images from ICO and CUR format images was introduced in Windows Vista. A PNG image can be stored in the image in the same way as done for a standard Windows BMP format image, with the exception that the PNG image must be stored in its entirety, with its file header and must be in 32bpp ARGB format.

Icon library 
An icon library is a way to package Windows icons. It is typically a 16-bit New Executable or a 32-bit Portable Executable binary file having .ICL extension with icon resources being the packaged icons. Windows Vista and later versions do not support viewing icons from 16-bit (New Executable) files.

See also
 Apple Icon Image format
 BMP file format
 Computer icon
 Favicon
 List of icon software

Notes

References

External links
 Icon design guidelines for Windows Vista icons
 Icon design guidelines for Windows 10 app icons
 Icons (1995 Microsoft Technical Article)
 The evolution of the ICO file format (Part 1, Part 2, Part 3, Part 4)
 A Look Inside Windows Icons, Part 1 - PC Mag Jan 26, 1993 Vol.12 No. 2
 A Look Inside Windows Icons, Part 2 - PC Mag Feb 9, 1993 Vol.12 No. 3
 Enable High Color Icons in Windows 95 and later
 Enhance Java GUIs with Windows Icons

Raster graphics file formats
Microsoft Windows multimedia technology
Computer icons